Organized crime is a group or operation run by criminals, most commonly for the purpose of generating a monetary profit.

Organized Crime may also refer to:

Organized Crime (Mambo Kurt album), 2005
Organized Crime (Treat album), 1989
Law & Order: Organized Crime, an American crime-drama television series